Cleopatra the Physician (Greek: Κλεοπάτρα) was a Greek medical writer and author of a manual entitled Cosmetics.

Identity and date 
Cleopatra's work is known from six fragments of her writing, probably all from Cosmetics. Four of these fragments are quoted by the 2nd–3rd century CE physician Galen, and the other two by the Byzantine physicians Aetius of Amida and Paulus of Aegina. Nothing is known about her life, but her work can be dated to the late 1st century as she refers to a weight standard which was only in use after 64 CE, and she is known to have been cited in another work entitled Cosmetics by the late 1st-century physician Crito, from which Galen took his quotations of Cleopatra's writing. The identification of the Egyptian queen Cleopatra VII (died 30 BCE) as the author of this work, made by some ancient writers (including Aetius), is therefore incorrect. It has, however, been argued that Cleopatra may have chosen this name as a pseudonym in reference to Queen Cleopatra. She is also to be distinguished from Cleopatra the Alchemist.

Cosmetics 
The Cosmetics is a manual offering advice and instructions for preparing remedies for issues such as dandruff and baldness, with several different cures offered for each. These cures employed a wide variety of plants; liquid products such as oil, wine, and vinegar; minerals such as lead and soda; and animal products including roasted horse teeth, marrow from a stag, and mouse droppings. The surviving fragments also include a recipe for perfumed soap, instructions on curling and dyeing hair, and a list of different weights and measures systems in use around the Mediterranean. The manual therefore appears to be aimed at an international audience of physicians, who might provide both medicines and cosmetic products, since both were primarily based on plant products.

Gynaecology 
Two works on gynaecology are also attributed to an author named Cleopatra: the Gynaecia, a recipe collection of cures for gynaecological issues, and the Pessaria, a list of twenty pessaries. Both are preserved in Latin versions, though the preface of Gynaecia refers to its having been translated from Greek. It is possible that the original Greek versions of these works were also part of the Cosmetics, and that this work therefore had a broader scope than its title suggests, encompassing gynaecology as well as cosmetics.

See also 

 Women's medicine in antiquity

References 

Ancient women physicians
Women writers (ancient)
1st-century women writers
Date of birth unknown
Date of death unknown
Medical writers